The  Spokane Shock season was the eighth season for the franchise, and the fourth in the Arena Football League. The team was coached by Andy Olson and played their home games at Spokane Veterans Memorial Arena. With a 14–4 record in the regular season, the Shock qualified for the playoffs. However, they were defeated by the Arizona Rattlers in the conference championship game by a 65–57 score.

Final roster

Standings

Schedule

Regular season
The Shock began the season by visiting the Cleveland Gladiators on March 24. Their first home game was against the Arizona Rattlers on April 12. They will close the regular season at home against the Pittsburgh Power on July 26.

Playoffs

References

Spokane Shock
Spokane Shock seasons